My Fab 40th is an American reality television series which premiered on the Bravo cable network, on August 25, 2015. Announced in March 2015, the six-part one-hour series chronicles various "from unlimited budgets to lavish delicacies and over-the-top entertainment" fortieth birthday celebrations, with each episode featuring different people.

Episodes

References

External links 

 
 

2010s American reality television series
2015 American television series debuts
2015 American television series endings
Bravo (American TV network) original programming
English-language television shows